Brindpur  is a village in Kapurthala district of Punjab State, India. The village is administrated by a Sarpanch who is an elected representative of village as per the constitution of India and Panchayati raj (India).

Demography 
According to the report published by Census India in 2011, Brindpur has a total number of 156 houses and population of 850 of which include 437 males and 413 females. Literacy rate of Brindpur is   81.01%, higher than state average of 75.84%.  The population of children under the age of 6 years is 76 which is 8.94% of total population of Brindpur, and child sex ratio is approximately  1171, higher than state average of 846.

Population data

Air travel connectivity 
The closest airport to the village is Sri Guru Ram Dass Jee International Airport.

Villages in Kapurthala

External links
  Villages in Kapurthala
 Kapurthala Villages List

References

Villages in Kapurthala district